Vaceuchelus is a genus of sea snails, marine gastropod molluscs in the family Chilodontaidae.

Distribution
This genus occurs in the Indo Pacific, from the Red Sea to French Polynesia; also off Australia.

Species
Species within the genus Vaceuchelus include:

 Vaceuchelus abdii Poppe, Tagaro & Dekker, 2006
 Vaceuchelus ampullus (Tate, 1893)
 Vaceuchelus auricatris Huang & Fu, 2015 
 Vaceuchelus cavernoides Vilvens, 2017
 Vaceuchelus cavernosus (G.B. Sowerby III, 1905)
 Vaceuchelus clathratus (A. Adams, 1853)
 Vaceuchelus cretaceus Herbert, 2012
 Vaceuchelus delpretei (Caramagna, 1888)
 Vaceuchelus entienzai Poppe & Tagaro, 2016
 Vaceuchelus favosus (Melvill & Standen, 1896)
 Vaceuchelus foveolatus (A. Adams, 1853)
 Vaceuchelus gemmula (Turton, 1932)
 Vaceuchelus gotoi Poppe & Tagarao, 2020
 Vaceuchelus jayorum Herbert, 2012
 Vaceuchelus natalensis (E.A. Smith, 1906)
 Vaceuchelus pagoboorum Poppe, Tagaro & Dekker, 2006
 Vaceuchelus phaios Vilvens, 2017
 Vaceuchelus profundior (May, 1915)
 Vaceuchelus rapaensis(Vilvens, 2017)
 Vaceuchelus scrobiculatus (Souverbie, 1866)
 Vaceuchelus semilugubris (Deshayes, 1863)
 Vaceuchelus vallesi Poppe, Tagaro & Dekker, 2006
 Vaceuchelus vangoethemi Poppe, Tagaro & Dekker, 2006
Synonyms
 Vaceuchelus angulatus (Pease, 1867): synonym of Vaceuchelus foveolatus (A. Adams, 1853) (junior subjective synonym)
 Vaceuchelus ludiviniae Poppe, Tagaro & Dekker, 2006: synonym of Herpetopoma ludiviniae (Poppe, Tagaro & H. Dekker, 2006) (original combination)
 Vaceuchelus mysticus (Pilsbry, 1890): synonym of Euchelus mysticus Pilsbry, 1889
 Vaceuchelus roseolus (G. Nevill & H. Nevill, 1869): synonym of Tallorbis roseola G. Nevill & H. Nevill, 1869
 Vaceuchelus saguili Poppe, Tagaro & Dekker, 2006: synonym of Vaceuchelus favosus (Melvill & Standen, 1896)

References

 Wilson, B. 1993. Australian Marine Shells. Prosobranch Gastropods. Kallaroo, Western Australia : Odyssey Publishing Vol. 1 408 pp. 
 Poppe G.T., Tagaro S.P. & Dekker H. (2006) The Seguenziidae, Chilodontidae, Trochidae, Calliostomatidae and Solariellidae of the Philippine Islands. Visaya Supplement 2: 1-228. page(s): 47

External links
 Iredale, T. (1929). Queensland molluscan notes, No. 1. Memoirs of the Queensland Museum. 9(3): 261-297, pls 30-31
 Herbert D.G. (2012) A revision of the Chilodontidae (Gastropoda: Vetigastropoda: Seguenzioidea) of southern Africa and the south-western Indian Ocean. African Invertebrates, 53(2): 381–502

 
Chilodontaidae
Gastropod genera